Events in the year 1884 in Argentina.

Incumbents
 President: Julio Argentino Roca
 Vice President: Francisco Bernabé Madero

Governors
 Buenos Aires Province: Dardo Rocha (until 1 May); Carlos Alfredo D'Amico (from 1 May)
 Cordoba: Gregorio Gavier 
 Mendoza Province: José Miguel Segura (until 15 February); Rufino Ortega (from 15 February)
 Santa Fe Province: Manuel María Zavalla

Vice Governors
Buenos Aires Province: Adolfo Gonzales Chaves (until 1 May); Matías Cardoso (starting 1 May)

Events

Births
August 13 - Agustín Bardi, tango musician

Deaths

 
History of Argentina (1880–1916)
Years of the 19th century in Argentina